Plagiaulacidae is a family of fossil mammals within the order Multituberculata. Remains are known from the Upper Jurassic and earliest Cretaceous of North America and Europe. They were among the more derived representatives of the informal suborder of "Plagiaulacida".

The taxon Plagiaulacidae was named by Gill T.N. in 1872. It is also known as Bolodontidae, a name developed by Osborn H.F. in 1887.

References 
 Gill (1872), "Arrangement of the families of mammals". With analytical tables. Smithsonian Miscellaneous Collections 230, p. 1-98.
 Osborn (1887), "On the structure and classification of the British Mesozoic Mammalia". Proc. of the Nat. Academy of Sciences 39, p. 282-292.
 Kielan-Jaworowska Z. and Hurum J.H. (2001), "Phylogeny and Systematics of multituberculate mammals". Paleontology 44, p. 389-429.
 Much of this information has been derived from  MESOZOIC MAMMALS: Plagiaulacidae, Albionbaataridae, Eobaataridae & Arginbaataridae, an Internet directory.

Multituberculates
Tithonian first appearances
Berriasian extinctions
Prehistoric mammal families